The 1918 Sewanee Tigers football team represented the Sewanee Tigers of Sewanee: The University of the South during the 1918 Southern Intercollegiate Athletic Association football season. Zach Curlin played for Fort Oglethorpe.

Schedule

References

Sewanee
Sewanee Tigers football seasons
Sewanee Tigers football